Chirakkadavu Mahadevar Temple is situated between the Kollam-Theni route of the National Highway 183, about 32 km east of the Akshra Nagari, Kottayam city and 3 km south of Ponkunnam en route to Manimala and Erumely.

History
Chirakkadava Sri Mahadevar Temple is a very Ancient Temple about 1000 years old and the idol is a 'Swayambhu Siva Lingam which was found under a 'bilva Tree' (Aegle marmelos). It is believed that the temple was built during the time of the 'Alwars'. There is also a temple tank, from where the mud was dug up to build this temple. Devotees could wash their feet in the water of the streams around the place before entering the temple. Because of the pond ('Chira' in Malayalam ) in the eastern side of the temple the place is called 'Chirakadavu'.

Mythology
The king who built the temple is said to have built an 'ashram' during his last days, near the vilva tree. He did 'Tapas' there and came to be known as Kuwala (Bilwa) Maharshi. During his 'Tapas' the Lord appeared in his dreams and according to his wish the king continued his penance and is said to have entered heavenly abode.

The temple structure
The 'Balikallu' of this temple is very big in size. In front of this there is beautiful sculpture and a huge lamp earned out of granite which attract attention. Even though the 'Balikallu' is huge in size the Darshan of the Lord is possible if we stand near the gate of the eastern gopuram. The wooden carvings all round the temple is extremely attractive. The clean and peaceful atmosphere of this temple attracts many devotees. There are 5 poojas, 3 Seeveli and daily 'Navakam' in this temple.

Festivals
In the past when there were no vehicles and when people used to walk to Sabarimala on pilgrimage, they would halt in this Chirakadavu Temple. The Ayyappa devotees considered Chirakadavu Sri Mahadeva as the father of Lord Ayyappan. So several Ayyappa Devotees visit this temple. Even the day every year on Dhanu 24th the pilgrims going to Sabarimala conduct "Ayyappan Pattu" in this temple as they had done in the past.

The "Velakali" of Sri Mahadeva temple performed during the festival time is a very rare item. For this children between the age of five and twenty dressed up as warriors holding swords and shield dance according to the rhythmic beat on the drums. This 'Velathullal' dance is indeed a splendid sight.

"Meenari" is a famous offering of this temple. During the 'Karkidaka Vavu' devotees buy rice from the temple and feed the fish in the temple pond. Many devotees rush to the temple to perform this special offering. People believe that those who perform this 'Vazhipadu' can get cured of many diseases.

'Jaladhara and Mrithinjaya Pushpanjali' are also offered by several devotees to get cure the diseases. Likewise 'Swayamvara Pushpanjali' is offered by several youth irrespective of sex to get better marital relations. It is a very surprisingly experience that these offering turns very positive results.

An important vazhipadu 'Chaturshatam' is performed in this temple which is a rare offering. Due to the traditional rituals followed and the income of the temple it occupies an important place in the Devaswom Board Temples. Also this is one of the very few self-sufficient temples of the [Travancore] Dewasom Board.

See also
 Temples of Kerala
 Chirakkadavu
 Ponkunnam

External links

 

Hindu temples in Kottayam district